George Wedel (18 May 1900 – 16 April 1981) was an English cricketer. He played for Gloucestershire between 1925 and 1929.

References

External links

1900 births
1981 deaths
English cricketers
Gloucestershire cricketers
Sportspeople from Leigh, Greater Manchester